Billy Taylor (born June 12, 1973) is an American college basketball coach. He is the current head coach for the Elon Phoenix men's basketball team. Taylor previously served as the head men's basketball coach at Lehigh University from 2002 to 2007 and Ball State University from 2007 to 2013.

Playing career
Taylor was an honor roll student and commencement speaker at West Aurora High School in Aurora, Illinois.  He was recruited by Digger Phelps to play at the University of Notre Dame, though he played under John MacLeod.

Coaching career
After spending three years working for Arthur Andersen and earning his CPA, Taylor took an assistant coaching position under MacLeod at Notre Dame in 1998. One year later he followed former Lehigh head coach Fran McCaffery to UNC Greensboro.

Taylor was appointed to succeed Sal Mentesana as the 26th men's basketball head coach at Lehigh University on April 16, 2002. In his inaugural campaign, he become the all-time winningest first-year coach in Lehigh history. The Mountain Hawks surprised many by winning 16 games, including eight in the Patriot League. Their eleven-game improvement over the year before was the second best in all of Division I. For his outstanding efforts, Taylor earned the 2002–03 Patriot League Coach of the Year honors in voting by the league coaches. In 2003-04, Taylor led Lehigh to its first-ever Patriot League regular season and tournament championships, as well as a trip to the NCAA tournament. For his efforts, Taylor earned the league's Coach of the Year honor for the second time in as many seasons, becoming the first coach since Gonzaga's Mark Few to win conference coach of the year honors in each of his first two seasons as a head coach.

In 2005-06, Lehigh posted the third-most wins in school history with its 19-12 overall mark and a school-record 11 Patriot League wins.

In August 2007 Taylor was offered and took the head coaching position at Ball State University. During his six seasons at Ball State (2007–13), the Cardinals finished either first or second in the Mid-American Conference (MAC) West Division three times and advanced to the MAC Tournament semifinals twice. Taylor coached nine all-conference selections and also mentored a MAC All-Freshman Team member five straight seasons. He was fired in March 2013.

Taylor rejoined McCaffery prior to the 2013–14 season at the University of Iowa.  Taylor was Hawkeyes staff for back-to-back NCAA Tournament teams (2013–14 and 2014–15). In 2014-15, Iowa advanced to the Round of 32 after posting its largest margin of victory ever in an NCAA Tournament game, a 31-point win over Davidson.  The Hawkeyes produced back-to-back first-team All-Big Ten honorees and NBA Draft selections (Roy Devyn Marble in 2014 and Aaron White in 2015) with Taylor on staff. In June 2016, Taylor was hired as the head men's basketball coach at Belmont Abbey College in Belmont, North Carolina where he'd post a 49–42 record in three seasons. In May 2019, he rejoined McCaffery at Iowa.

On April 15, Taylor was named the 19th head coach in Elon basketball history, replacing Mike Schrage.

Head coaching record

References

External links
 Belmont Abbey profile
 2aDays reactions

1973 births
Living people
American men's basketball coaches
American men's basketball players
Ball State Cardinals men's basketball coaches
Belmont Abbey Crusaders men's basketball coaches
Basketball coaches from Illinois
Basketball players from Illinois
College men's basketball head coaches in the United States
Iowa Hawkeyes men's basketball coaches
Lehigh Mountain Hawks men's basketball coaches
Notre Dame Fighting Irish men's basketball coaches
Notre Dame Fighting Irish men's basketball players
Place of birth missing (living people)
Sportspeople from Aurora, Illinois
UNC Greensboro Spartans men's basketball coaches
Elon Phoenix men's basketball coaches